Elections to Rushmoor Borough Council took place on 5 May 2022 as part of the 2022 United Kingdom local elections.

Background

Results summary

Ward results

Aldershot Park

Cherrywood

Cove and Southwood

Empress

Fernhill

Knellwood

Manor Park

North Town

Rowhill

St John’s

St Mark’s

Wellington

West Heath

References

Rushmoor
2020s in Hampshire
Rushmoor Borough Council elections